The Russian Ilizarov Scientific Center for Restorative Traumatology and Orthopaedics or RISC RTO (Russian: Российский научный центр «Восстановительная травматология и ортопедия» имени академика Г. А. Илизарова) is a medical institution located in the city of Kurgan, Kurgan Oblast, Russia; and financed by the Russian Federal State. The center is the largest in the world that specializes in the treatment of complex orthopaedic problems. It is named after the orthopedic surgeon Gavriil Ilizarov, who invented the Ilizarov apparatus, which is a method of transosseous osteosynthesis or Ilizarov method for the surgical procedure to lengthen or reshape limb bones. Every year, over 9,000 people receive treatment and rehabilitation at the RISC RTO. Patients of any country and age group can apply for treatment at the RISC RTO. The center is registered as one of the largest hospitals in the world and has the ability to treat up to 1,000 patients at any time.

As at mid-2010, Professor Vladimir I. Shevtsov was the General Director of the center and taught the application of the Ilizarov methods in numerous countries including the US, United Kingdom, Italy, Germany, Japan, and South Korea. Since October 2010, the center is headed by Alexander V. Gubin. Scientific Center was awarded the Order of the Badge of Honour in 1982.

References

External links

 Functional Muscular Condition Dynamics at Osteoarthrosis Conservative Treatment of Major Joints of Lower Extremities

Hospitals in Russia
Companies based in Kurgan, Kurgan Oblast
Hospitals built in the Soviet Union
1971 establishments in the Soviet Union